Katy Feeney (born March 2, 1949) was a Major League Baseball executive. She worked for MLB for forty years, under six  commissioners. She retired as senior vice president of Club Relations and Scheduling. Few women reached the level of MLB executive.

Early life 
She was the daughter of longtime baseball executive Chub Feeney. She was the great-granddaughter of Charles Stoneham and great-niece of Horace Stoneham.

Career 
Feeney was one of the most prominent women in baseball and the sport's expert on its complicated scheduling rules. Feeney was a well known presence at games. She was often seen wearing a stylish hat. She retired from baseball in December 2016.

Death 
Feeney died April 1, 2017 at age 68 while visiting relatives in Maine.

Legacy 
In honor of Katy's impact, an annual Katy Feeney Leadership Symposium was formed. As many as 41 women at the Vice President level or higher from across the field attended. The symposium held across multiple days, and encourages women in the baseball world to excel.  partnered with Stanford University's executive education department for the event. A Katy Feeney Scholarship is offered through the University of San Francisco's sports management program.

Recognition 

 Robert O. Fishel Award for Public Relations excellence (1994).

References 

1949 births
2017 deaths
Major League Baseball executives
American female baseball players